Siberian Tatars, the indigenous Turkic-speaking population of the forests and steppes of Western Siberia, originate in areas stretching from somewhat east of the Ural Mountains to the Yenisey River in Russia. The Siberian Tatars call themselves Yerle Qalıq ("older inhabitants"), to distinguish themselves from more recent Volga Tatar immigrants to the region.

The word "Tatar" or "Tadar" is also used as a self-designation by some closely related Siberian ethnic groups, namely the Altaians, Chulyms, Khakas, and Shors.

The 2010 census counted more than 500,000 people in Siberia defining their ethnicity as "Tatar". About 200,000 of them are considered indigenous Siberian Tatars. However, only 6,779 of them called themselves "Siberian Tatars". It is not completely clear which part of those who called themselves "Siberian Tatars" consider themselves to be a separate ethnos and which part as a group into the Tatar people, because the census took into account the Siberian Tatars as a subgroup of the Tatar ethnos.

, the Siberian Tatars do not yet have public education available in their own language. Lessons in the local schools are taught only in the Russian and Volga Tatar languages.

Population
Siberian Tatars historically lived in the vast territory stretching from around the Yenisey River all the way to the area lying somewhat east of the Ural Mountains.

According to the ambassadors of the Siberian Khanate ruler Yediger Khan, who visited Moscow in 1555, the population of "the black people", not counting the aristocracy, was 30,700. In a decree concerning tribute issued by Ivan the Terrible, the population was given as 40,000.

According to the results of the 1897 All-Russia Census, there were 56,957 Siberian Tatars in the Tobolsk Governorate. This was the last accurate information about this population. In later censuses, Tatar immigrants from the other regions of Russia were also recorded under the classification of Tatar. The Siberian Tatars tried to avoid the census as much as possible, as they believed that it was an attempt to force them to pay the Yasak (tribute).

Their population in the territory of the current Tyumen Oblast in 1926 was recorded as 70,000; in 1959 as 72,306; in 1970 as 102,859; 136,749 in 1979; 227,423 in 1989; and 242,325 in 2002. According to the results of the 2002 Russian Census, there were 385,949 Tatars living in the oblasts discussed above. (Their territory roughly corresponds to the historical territory of the Siberian Khanate). Of these Tatars only 9,289 identified as Siberian Tatars.

2002 Russian Census recorded a total of 9,611 Siberian Tatars in Russia. Some publications estimated their number in the range of 190,000-210,000. Such significant discrepancy is explained by the fact that the immigrants from the other ethnic groups who are also called Tatar by the Russians were also included in the figure, though most were Volga Tatars.

Physical anthropology
Like most of the modern indigenous human groups of West Siberia, Siberian Tatars reveal traits that are specific of West Siberian anthropological type. Siberian Tatars show a combination of features characteristic of both western and eastern Eurasian groups.

Origin and ethnogenesis
The term Siberian Tatar covers three autochthonous groups, all Sunni Muslims of the Hanafi madhab, found in southern Siberia. Siberian Tatars have been living in Western Siberia since the 6th century. They are remnants of the Khanate of Sibir, which was conquered by Russia in 1582. Geographically, the Siberian Tatars are divided into three main groups, each speaking their own dialect. Although the Siberian Tatar language has been sometimes considered a dialect of Tatar, detailed linguistic study demonstrates that Siberian Tatar idioms are quite remote from Volga Tatar by origin. Siberian Tatars' ancestry was partly from Turkic and Mongol peoples, but their main ancestors are Ugrian, Samoyedic, and Yeniseian tribes.

Siberian Tatar language

The Siberian Tatar language is, due to the Kipchakization processes during the Middle Ages, many times classified as belonging to the Kipchak–Nogay group of the Kipchak languages. There are approximately as many elements that could be classified in the Upper Altaian language group.

Beginning in the 12th century, the Siberian Tatar language received some Karluk influences. Those Siberian Tatars who are living in ethnically mixed villages where, in the periods after Russian colonization, more numerous Volga Tatars settled, have also been influenced by the Kipchak-Bulgar language.

Siberian Tatar language has different dialects. Since the penetration of Islam until the 1920s after the Russian Revolution, Siberian Tatars, like all Muslim nations, were using an alphabet that had been based on Arabic script. They adopted an alphabet based on Latin script in 1928 and one based on the Cyrillic script in 1939. Until 2014, the written language for Siberian Tatars was Tatar, a version based on the grammar rules of Volga Tatars.

In the 21st century, work began on the rationalizing of the Siberian Tatar language. Teams have conducted scientific research in the field of literary language norms of the indigenous population of Siberia. They have published the "Русско-сибирскотатарский словарь = Урысца-сыбырца сүслек" (2010) (Russian-Siberian Tatar Dictionary), and "Грамматика современного сибирскотатарского языка" (2014)(The Grammar of Modern Siberian Tatar Language). International Organization for Standardization ISO 639-3 PA with its headquarters in Washington, awarded in 2013, the Siberian Tatar language classification code 'sty' in New Language Code Element in ISO 639-3.
The first person who seriously researched Siberian Tatar language was Gabdulkhay Akhatov, a Soviet Volga Tatar linguist and an organizer of science.

Culture 
Traditional occupations of the Siberian Tatars included hunting, raising horses, and porterage (the latter being important because of the major trade routes situated within the region). Starting in the 19th century, some Siberian Tatars sought work in tanneries and sawmills. Modern Siberian Tatars work in various and diverse occupations.

Some traditional foods in Siberian Tatar cuisine include barley, kattama, boortsog, noodles, and peremech along with several dairy items like kaymak and qurut.

The Siberian Tatars profess Sunni Islam. Before converting to Islam, the Siberian Tatars practiced shamanism. Shamanistic influences can still be found in certain funerary and spiritual customs. Islamization of the region first occurred around the 14th century. The adoption of Islam among the Siberian Tatars began by the early 15th century. The conversion of the last communities was complete by the late 18th century. Contact with Siberian Bukharans and later Volga Tatars helped facilitate the acceptance of Islam among the Siberian Tatars.

Groups

Tobol-Irtysh Tatars
The Tobol-Irtysh Tatars group is the most numerous out of all 3 groups of Siberian Tatars. They live in the Omsk, Tyumen, Kurgan, and Sverdlovsk Oblasts.

The sub-groups are: Zabolotnie (Yaskolbinsk), Tobol, Kurdak-Sargat, Tara, Tyumen-Tura.

Baraba Tatars
Their self-designation is Baraba, and they are found mainly in the steppe of Baraba, in the Novosibirsk Oblast. Their population is around 8,000.

The sub-groups are: Baraba-Turazh, Lyubey-Tunus, Terenin-Choy.

Tom Tatars
The Tom Tatars are indigenous population of Tomsk, Kemerovo and Novosibirsk Oblasts.

The sub-groups are: Kalmak, Chat, Eushta.

Siberian Bukharans

The Bukharlyks, literally "those from the city of Bukhara" are descendants of 15th- and 16th-century fur merchant colonies from Western Caucasus. These settlers have now merged entirely with Siberian Tatars.

Famous Siberian Tatars
Minsalim Timergazeev – sculptor
Anvar Kaliev – World War II USSR hero
Iskander Dautov – World War II USSR hero
Khamit Neatbakov (Neotbakov) – World War II USSR hero
Khabibulla Yakin – holder of the Order of glory
Tamerlan Ishmukhamedov – World War II USSR hero
Raushan Abdullin – hero of the Russian Federation
Nafigulla Ashirov – mufti, president of The Spiritual Muslim Board of the Asiatic Part of Russia
Galima Shugurova – rhythmic gymnast
Aleksandr Bashirov – film and theater actor, director and screenwriter (Siberian Tatar mother)
Abdurreshid Ibrahim – imam, pan-Islamist, journalist, traveller
Foat-Tach Valeev – World War II USSR veteran, colonel, pedagogist, journalist, historian, sibirologist, ethnographer, professor
Yakub Zankiev – writer
Bulat Suleymanov – writer (with also some Georgian ancestry)
Anas Gaitov – writer
Rakip Ibragimov – poet

See also

Khanate of Sibir

References

External links
Group of Siberian Tatars.
Information about Kalmaks.
Siberian Tatars.
Baraba Tatars.
Song in Siberian Tatar language
Modern Siberian Tatars
History of Siberian Tatars

Customs and traditions of the Siberian Tatars of Vagaysky district

 
Ancient peoples
Ethnic groups in Siberia
Khanate of Sibir
Kemerovo Oblast
Novosibirsk Oblast
Omsk Oblast
Tomsk Oblast
Tyumen Oblast
Ethnic groups in Russia
Ethnic groups in Uzbekistan
Ethnic groups in Kazakhstan
Ethnic groups in Turkey
Indigenous peoples of North Asia
Muslim communities of Russia
Turkic peoples of Asia